The history of Delaware as a political entity dates back to the early colonization of North America by European settlers. Delaware is made up of three counties established in 1638, before the time of William Penn. Each county had its own settlement history. The state's early colonists tended to identify more closely with their county than Delaware as a whole. Large parts of southern and western Delaware were thought to have been in Maryland until 1767. The state has existed in the wide economic and political circle of the nearby Pennsylvanian city of Philadelphia.

Native Americans
Before Delaware was settled by Europeans, the area was home to the Lenni Lenape (also known as the Delaware), Susquehanna, Nanticoke, and other Native American tribes. After the Swedes, Dutch colonists settled Delaware, with the native people trading with European settlers for around a half-century.

Dutch and Swedish colonies

The Delaware watershed was claimed by the English based on the explorations of John Cabot in 1497, Captain John Smith, and others and was given the name of a title held by Thomas West, 3rd Baron De La Warr, the governor of Virginia from 1610 until 1618. At that time, the area was considered to be part of the Virginia colony.

However, the Dutch thought they also had a claim based on the 1609 explorations of Henry Hudson, and under the auspices of the Dutch West India Company, were the first Europeans to actually occupy the land. They established trading-posts: Fort Wilhelmus in 1624 at "Hooghe Eyland" (High Island), now Burlington Island, opposite Burlington, New Jersey; Fort Nassau, near Gloucester City, New Jersey, in 1626; and at Zwaanendael, now Lewes, Delaware, in 1631. Peter Minuit was the Dutch Director-General of New Netherland during this period and probably spent some time at the Burlington Island post, thereby familiarizing himself with the region.

In any case, Minuit had a disagreement with the directors of the Dutch West India Company, was recalled from New Netherland, and quickly made his services available to his many friends in Sweden, then a major power in European politics. They established a Swedish South Company, aimed at settling the territory of New Sweden, and, following much negotiation, he led a group under the flag of Sweden to the Delaware River in 1638. They established a trading post at Fort Christina, now in Wilmington. Minuit claimed possession of the western side of the Delaware River, saying he had found no European settlement there. Unlike the Dutch West India Company, the Swedes intended to actually bring settlers to their outpost and begin a colony.

Minuit drowned in a hurricane on the way home that same year, but the Swedish colony continued to grow gradually. By 1644, Swedish and Finnish settlers were living along both sides of the Delaware River from Fort Christina to the Schuylkill River. New Sweden's best known governor, Johan Björnsson Printz, moved his residence to what is now Tinicum Township, Pennsylvania, where he intended to concentrate the settlements.

While the Dutch settlement at Zwaanendael ("swan valley"), or present-day Lewes, was soon destroyed in a war with Native Americans, the Dutch never gave up their claim to the area, and in 1651 built Fort Casimir, now New Castle, under the leadership of Peter Stuyvesant. Three years later, in 1654, Johan Risingh, the Swedish governor, captured Fort Casimir from the Dutch. For the Swedes, this was a catastrophic miscalculation, as the next summer, 1655, an enraged Stuyvesant led another Dutch expedition to the Delaware River, attacked all the Swedish communities and forcibly ended the New Sweden colony, incorporating the whole area back into the New Netherland colony.

English colony

It was not long, though, before the Dutch too were forcibly removed by the English, who asserted their earlier claim. In 1664, James, the Duke of York and brother of King Charles II, outfitted an expedition that easily ousted the Dutch from both the Delaware and Hudson rivers, leaving the Duke of York the proprietary authority in the entire area.

But Cecil Calvert, 2nd Baron Baltimore, Proprietor of Maryland, claimed a competing grant to lands on the western shore of Delaware Bay, including all of the present state of Delaware. In deference to the royal will of Charles II to please his brother, James, Duke of York, Calvert did not press his claim. James, the Duke of York, believed he had won the area in war and was justified in ownership. The area was administered from New York as a part of James' New York colony.

William Penn was granted "Pennsylvania", in which the grant specifically excluded New Castle or any of the lands within  of it. Nevertheless, Penn wanted an outlet to the sea from his new province. He persuaded James to lease him the western shore of Delaware Bay. So, in 1682, Penn arrived in New Castle with two documents: a charter for the Province of Pennsylvania and a lease for what became known as "the Lower Counties on the Delaware".

Penn had inherited James' claims and thus began nearly 100 years of litigation between Penn and Baltimore, and their heirs, in the High Court of Chancery in London. The settlement of the legal battles was started by the heirs' agreeing to the survey performed by Charles Mason and Jeremiah Dixon between 1763 and 1767. Their work resulted in the famous Mason–Dixon line. The final adjudication of the settlement was not completed until the eve of the American Revolution. The settlement was a major reason for the close political alliance between the property owners of the Lower Counties and the Royalist Proprietary government.

In William Penn's Frame of Government of 1682, he established a combined assembly for his domain by providing for equal membership from each county and requiring legislation to have the assent of both the Lower Counties and the Upper Counties of Chester, Philadelphia and Bucks. The assembly meeting place alternated between Philadelphia and New Castle. Once Philadelphia began to grow, its leaders resented having to go to New Castle and gain agreement of the assemblymen from the sparsely populated Lower Counties. In 1704, members of the two regions mutually agreed to meet and pass laws separately from then on. The Lower Counties did continue to share a governor, but the Province of Pennsylvania never merged with the Lower Counties.

The Mason–Dixon line forms the boundary between Delaware and Maryland; this begins at the Transpeninsular Line. The border between Pennsylvania and Delaware is formed by an arc known as the Twelve-Mile Circle laid out in the seventeenth century to clearly delineate the area within the sphere of influence of New Castle. A small dispute lingered until 1921 over an area known as the Wedge, where the Mason–Dixon line and the Twelve-Mile Circle left a fragment of land claimed by both Pennsylvania and Delaware.

American Revolution
Delaware was one of the Thirteen Colonies which revolted against British rule in the American Revolution. After the Revolution began in 1776, the three Lower Counties became "The Delaware State", and in 1776 that entity adopted its first constitution, declaring itself to be the "Delaware State". Its first governors went by the title of "President".

The Battle of Cooch's Bridge was the only major military engagement of the Revolution that took place on Delaware soil. The Americans harried the lead forces of the British Army. However, the roughly 700 colonials were greatly outmanned and outgunned. Washington's troops were slowly driven back.

By September 3, the colonials had dropped back to Cooch's Bridge. A handpicked regiment of 100 marksmen under General William Maxwell laid an ambush in the surrounding cover. Over the ensuing battle, several British and Hessian charges were repelled, but the Americans soon depleted their ammunition and called a retreat.

The property was taken by the British, and several buildings were burned. General Cornwallis used the Cooch house as his headquarters for the next week as the British regrouped. American casualties numbered around 30.

Shortly afterward, General Howe moved his troops out. On September 11, he defeated the colonials in the Battle of Brandywine and subsequently captured the colonial capital of Philadelphia.

Delaware had a Loyalist insurrection in April 1778 called the Clow Rebellion.

In 1783, the independence of the United States and therefore Delaware was confirmed in the Treaty of Paris.

1783–1860
Delaware was the first state to ratify the United States Constitution.

Éleuthère Irénée du Pont arrived in America from France in 1800 and founded the young United States' largest gunpowder factory on the banks of the Brandywine River just north of Wilmington in 1804. His DuPont firm (now the world's fourth largest chemical company) was the U.S. military's largest supplier of gunpowder by the beginning of the Civil War, and his descendants, the du Pont family, are now one of the richest and most successful families in the country.

The oldest black church in the country was chartered in Delaware by former slave Peter Spencer in 1813 as the "Union Church of Africans", which is now the A.U.M.P. Church. The Big August Quarterly which began in 1814 is still celebrated and is the oldest such cultural festival in the country.
 
The construction of the Chesapeake and Delaware Canal between 1802 and 1829 brought significant shipping interests to Delaware, expanding the state's commercial opportunities.

Population

Delaware in the Civil War
Slavery had been a divisive issue in Delaware for decades before the American Civil War began. Opposition to slavery in Delaware, imported from Quaker-dominated Pennsylvania, led many slaveowners to free their slaves; half of the state's black population was free by 1810, and more than 90% were free by 1860. This trend also led pro-slavery legislators to restrict free black organizations, and the constabulary in Wilmington was accused of harsh enforcement of runaway slave laws, while many Delawareans kidnapped free blacks among the large communities throughout the state and sold them to plantations further south.

During the Civil War, Delaware was a slave state that remained in the Union. (Delaware voters voted not to secede on January 3, 1861.) Delaware had been the first state to embrace the Union by ratifying the Constitution and would be the last to leave it, according to its governor at the time. Although most Delaware citizens who fought in the Civil War served in regiments on the Union side, some did, in fact, serve in Delaware companies on the Confederate side in the Maryland and Virginia Regiments. Delaware was the one slave state from which the Confederate States of America could not recruit a full regiment.

 By 1862, Fort Delaware, a harbor defense facility that was located on Pea Patch Island in the Delaware River and had been designed by chief engineer Joseph Gilbert Totten circa 1819, was pressed into service as a prison for Confederate prisoners of war, political prisoners, federal convicts, and privateer officers. The first prisoners of war (POWs) were confined in the fort's interior in casemates, empty powder magazines, or one of two small rooms in the sally port. The first general from the Confederate States of America to be housed at the fort was Brig. Gen. J. Johnston Pettigrew.

Prison conditions were initially "tolerable," according to research conducted by students at the University of Delaware. "In its first year of operation in 1862, the population varied from 3,434 prisoners in July to only 123 later that year due to routine prisoner exchanges between the North and the South." But by the summer of 1863, following multiple military engagements including July's Battle of Gettysburg, "the fort's population had swollen to over 12,000 due to the influx of prisoners from the battles at Vicksburg and Gettysburg," a change in numbers which soon began to negatively impact the quality of life for POWs.

As realization dawned that more housing would be needed for the increasing number of POWs captured by Union troops, officials at the fort embarked on a construction program in 1862, building barracks for enlisted soldiers which came to be known as the "bull pen." A 600-bed hospital was also built, as were barracks for the Union soldiers who would be brought in to guard the increasing POW ranks.

The first Confederate prisoner to die at Fort Delaware was Captain L. P. Halloway of the 27th Virginia Infantry. Captured at Winchester, Virginia on March 23, 1862, he died at the fort on April 9. By the end of the war, the fort had held almost 33,000 prisoners, roughly 2,500 of whom died as the conditions continued to deteriorate. Half of the deaths were reportedly due to an outbreak of variola (smallpox) in 1863. Other causes of death included: diarrhea (315), inflammation of the lungs (243), typhoid fever and/or malaria (215), scurvy (70), pneumonia (61), erysipelas (47), gunshot wounds (7), and drowning (5). In addition, 109 Union soldiers and 40 civilians also died at the fort during the war.

Among the political prisoners held at Fort Delaware was the Rev. Issac W. K. Handy, who had commented in December 1863 that the Civil War had tarnished one of the nation's most cherished symbols, the American flag. Arrested for comments made during a dinner, he was jailed without trial and, because habeas corpus had been suspended by this time during the war, he was then held at the fort for 15 months.

On February 8, 1865, two months before the end of the Civil War, Delaware voted to reject the Thirteenth Amendment to the United States Constitution and so voted to continue slavery beyond the Civil War. However, the gesture proved futile when other states ratified the amendment, which took effect in December 1865 and thereby ended slavery in Delaware. In a symbolic move, Delaware belatedly ratified the amendment on February 12, 1901 – 35 years after national ratification and 38 years after Lincoln's Emancipation Proclamation. Delaware also rejected the 14th Amendment and 15th Amendment during the Reconstruction Era.

1865–1899
After the Civil War, Democratic governments continued to dominate the South and imposed explicitly white supremacist regimes in the former slave states. The Delaware legislature declared blacks to be second-class citizens in 1866 and restricted their voting rights despite the Fifteenth Amendment, ensuring continued Democratic success in the state throughout most of the nineteenth century. Fearful that the 1875 Civil Rights Act passed by Congress might establish social equality, Delaware legislators passed Jim Crow laws that mandated racial segregation in public facilities and effectively codified the state’s tradition of white supremacy. The state's educational system was segregated by operation of law. Delaware's segregation was written into the state constitution, which, while providing at Article X, Section 2, that "no distinction shall be made on account of race or color", nonetheless required that "separate schools for white and colored children shall be maintained."

1900–present
In 1952, Gebhart v. Belton was decided by the Delaware Court of Chancery and affirmed by the Delaware Supreme Court in the same year. Gebhart was one of the five cases combined into Brown v. Board of Education, the 1954 decision of the United States Supreme Court which found racial segregation in United States public schools to be unconstitutional. 

The end result of the Gebhart and Brown litigation was that Delaware became fully integrated, albeit with time and much effort. The white supremacist Bryant Bowles raised $6,000 and founded the National Association for the Advancement of White People (NAAWP) to oppose the rulings. Bowles briefly attracted nationwide attention for leading a pro-segregation boycott of Milford High School. A mass meeting in Milford in October 1954 attracted a crowd of 3,000 people. Bowles encouraged a boycott to protest the integration of schools after eleven black students were enrolled in the previously racially segregated school. Only 456 out of 1562 students attended the next day, and the movement gained traction in the nearby town of Lincoln, where 116 of the 146 pupils in the local elementary school boycotted in solidarity. Mass protests continued in Milford; the school board eventually ceded to the protestors, expelling the black students. Several weeks later, Bowles was arrested for "conspiring to violate the state education law by leading a boycott at Milford’s integrated high school". The Attorney General later took action to revoke the NAAWP's corporate charter in September 1955. However, the ensuing unrest, which included cross burnings, rallies, and pro-segregation demonstrations, contributed to desegregation in most of Southern Delaware being delayed for another ten years. School segregation in the state would not end until 1967.

Some argue that while the state of race relations was dramatically improving post-Brown, any progress was destroyed in the wake of the rioting that broke out in Wilmington in April 1968 in the wake of the assassination of Dr. Martin Luther King Jr. in Memphis.  Delaware's response to the Wilmington riots was heavy-handed in the opinion of some, involving the virtual occupation of the city for over one year by the Delaware National Guard.

See also
Historical outline of Delaware
Women's suffrage in Delaware

References

Sources

 oenline free to borrow
 oenline free to borrow

Further reading
Borden, Morton; The Federalism of James A. Bayard (Columbia University Press, 1955)
 Delaware Federal Writers' Project; Delaware: A Guide to the First State (famous WPA guidebook 1938)
 Hancock, Harold. "Civil War Comes to Delaware." Civil War History 2.4 (1956): 29-46 online.
 Hancock, Harold Bell. The Loyalists of Revolutionary Delaware (2nd ed 1977) online free to borrow
Johnson, Amandus The Swedes in America 1638–1900: Vol. I, The Swedes on the Delaware 1638–1664. (1914)
Johnson, Amandus The Swedish Settlements on the Delaware 1638–1664, Volume II (1927)

 Miller, Richard F. ed. States at War, Volume 4: A Reference Guide for Delaware, Maryland, and New Jersey in the Civil War (2015) excerpt 890pp.

Myers, Albert Cook ed., Narratives of Early Pennsylvania, West New Jersey, and Delaware, 1630–1707 (1912)
Ward, Christopher Dutch and Swedes on the Delaware, 1609- 1664 (University of Pennsylvania Press, 1930)
Wiener, Roberta and James R. Arnold. Delaware: The History Of Delaware Colony, 1638–1776 (2004)
Weslager, C. A.  New Sweden on the Delaware, 1638–1655 (The Middle Atlantic Press, Wilmington. 1988)

External links
 Boston Public Library, Map Center. Maps of Delaware, various dates.

 
Delaware